The murder of Angela Samota occurred on October 13, 1984, when she was attacked while in her apartment, raped and killed. The case remained unsolved until DNA evidence surfaced in the 2000s, following which charges were brought against a convicted rapist, Donald Andrew Bess Jr, who was subsequently tried and received the death penalty. He died of natural causes while awaiting execution in October 2022.

Background
Angela "Angie" Marie Samota was born on September 19, 1964, in Alameda, California. She enrolled at the Southern Methodist University in Dallas, Texas and was a part of the Zeta Tau Alpha sorority. She was studying computer science and electrical engineering.

Assault
On the night of October 12, 1984, Samota and two friends, one male and one female, went to the State Fair of Texas. Samota's boyfriend did not join them because, according to the subsequent police report, he was working in construction and said he had to get up early the following morning. The three friends went to the Rio Room dance club and stayed there until "after midnight." According to subsequent testimony of the male who accompanied the two girls, Samota "was going [from] table to table, talking to people" and seemed like "she knew everyone." 

Afterward, Samota drove her two companions to their homes, first dropping off the male at around 1a.m. at his apartment on Matilda Street, in Lower Greenville, which was a five-minute walk from Samota's condo on Amesbury Drive, and then the female. The man later testified that, when he returned home, "he went to bed and fell asleep."

Samota next went by her boyfriend's apartment to say goodnight and returned to her place. The boyfriend subsequently stated that at approximately 1:45a.m. he got a call from Samota, who told him there was a man in her condo who asked her to use the phone and the bathroom. She did not know if the man was already there when she got home or if she allowed him to come in. "Talk to me," Samota reportedly said to her boyfriend, then said she would call "right back" and hung up. When she did not call back, the boyfriend phoned her, and no one answered. He drove to her condo, but there was no response when he knocked on the door, which was locked. He had with him an early-generation mobile phone, provided for his construction job, so he called information, who connected him to the police.

Police officers arrived at 2:17a.m. and broke through the door. They discovered Samota's dead, bloody, and naked body on the bed. The autopsy showed that the victim had been raped and then "repeatedly" stabbed, dying from wounds to her heart.

Investigation and arrest
For a long period of time, the police reportedly suspected an architect who was 23 years old at the time and living in a Lower Greenville apartment. He was the man who, the night of the murder, had gone out with Samota and another girl. The victim's boyfriend was reportedly also a suspect.

The case remained unsolved until 2008.

In 2006, then-Dallas police detective Linda Crum, tasked with the case, used the DNA evidence from blood, semen, and fingernail samples to try to find a match among persons with a criminal record. In 2008, the results pointed to a Donald Bess who, at the time of Samota's murder, was on parole while serving a 25-year sentence.

Claims by friend
Sheila Wysocki, who went to SMU and was a roommate of Samota, subsequently stated that the cold case was re-opened only because she kept "badgering" the police until "they were so sick and tired of" her that they assigned detective Crum to re-examine it. Wysocki credits the fact that she became a licensed private investigator in her desire to assist in solving Samota's murder. The police initially had stated the rape kit collected at the crime scene, which contained the incriminating DNA evidence, had been lost "in the [Dallas] floods."

Legal process
The defendant in the 2010 trial for the sexual assault and murder of Angela Samota was already in prison, serving a life sentence. Donald Andrew Bess Jr. (born September 1, 1948, in Jefferson County, Arkansas), had been previously convicted in 1978 for aggravated sexual assault and aggravated kidnapping. He had been sentenced to 25 years in prison, and was out on parole by 1984, when, according to the court's decision, he raped and murdered Samota. 

In 1985, in a case unrelated to Samota's murder, Bess was sentenced in Harris County, Texas, to life imprisonment for one count of aggravated rape, one count of aggravated kidnapping and one count of sexual assault.

During the punishment phase of the Samota case trial, in 2010, various women came forward and testified that they had also been raped by Bess. The defendant's ex-wife testified that he had abused her and their child during their marriage. They had wed in 1969 and divorced three years later.

On the basis of the DNA match, Bess was found guilty by the jury and, on June 8, 2010, received the death sentence. On March 6, 2013, the appeal filed by Bess was rejected and the judgment of the trial court was affirmed. On August 13, 2013, a certiorari petition was filed to the U.S. Supreme Court, and denied on January 13, 2014. In April 2016, the Texas Court of Criminal Appeals refused an appeal submitted by Bess, upholding the findings of the Dallas County trial court.

Donald Bess died in prison from a heart attack on October 8, 2022, while awaiting execution.

Aftermath
In 2016, the Dallas Police Department re-established a unit dedicated to researching cold cases. In a 2021 Investigation Discovery episode, titled "Betrayed: Co-ed Killer", the case and the subsequent identification of Samota's murderer were re-enacted.

Donald Bess remained on death row at the Allan B. Polunsky Unit until his death on October 8, 2022. Samota's body is buried in the Llano Cemetery, Amarillo, Texas. Sheila Wysocki lives in Tennessee and is still a practicing private investigator.

The true crime series Dateline NBC produced an hour-long program covering the Samota case. Entitled In the Middle of the Night, it originally aired on NBC on June 8, 2012.

See also
 Cold case
 Recidivism

References

External links

1964 births
1984 deaths
1984 murders in the United States
American murder victims
Criminal investigation
Deaths by stabbing in Texas
Murder in Texas
October 1984 events in the United States
Rape in the United States
Violence against women in the United States
History of women in Texas